"The Pen" is the 20th episode of Seinfeld, the third episode of the third season which first aired on October 2, 1991.

This is the only episode in which the character of George Costanza does not appear and one of two episodes in which Kramer does not appear (the other being "The Chinese Restaurant"). Additionally, this episode is the first appearance of Morty's rival Jack Klompus and of Uncle Leo's wife (and Jerry's aunt) Stella.

Plot
Jerry and Elaine travel to Florida to visit Jerry's parents Morty and Helen at the Pines of Mar Gables Phase II for the weekend and plan on going scuba diving (which Helen doesn't see the point in doing). Morty is also being honored at a ceremony the next night. Jack Klompus and his wife Doris come over to write Morty a check for a previous night's dinner and Jerry notices Jack's pen. When Jerry asks Jack about it, Jack tells him that it can write upside down and that astronauts use it in space. Jack offers an interested Jerry the pen. Jerry refuses his offer several times, but Jack persists and Jerry finally gives in. Helen asks why he took the pen and says he should give it back because Doris will tell everyone in the condo that Jerry made Jack give it to him.

That night, Elaine sleeps on a sofa bed with a bar that sticks up through the mattress and injures her back, making her experience extreme pain, while not being helped by the fact that the air conditioning is turned off, since Jerry's parents are "nuts about temperature". Jerry tries to console her by saying they only have two more days left before they go back to New York. The next morning, Elaine's back is so sore that she cannot go scuba diving with Jerry, so he goes without her. Morty suggests she take muscle relaxants to ease the pain. Just as Helen predicted, their neighbor Evelyn tells the Seinfelds about the rumors that are beginning to spread around the Pines of Mar Gables Phase II that Jerry wanted Jack to give him the pen. When Jerry returns, he has black eyes because the capillaries around his eyes burst when he went underwater and the pressure was too tight on his mask.

Jack comes over again and Jerry returns the pen. Morty argues with Jack for "taking Jerry's pen". Elaine decides she wants to take the muscle relaxants, but takes the wrong dose and acts goofily at the ceremony. Jerry has to wear sunglasses because of his black eyes. At the dinner, Uncle Leo and Aunt Stella arrive to watch the event. Jack is the MC and turns the dinner into a "roast", making insults about Morty at the podium. Morty starts arguing with Jack again about taking back the pen and they start fighting, breaking Jack's dental plate in the process, prompting a bitter Jack to sue Morty.

The next day, a chiropractor looks at Elaine's back and tells her she should not go anywhere for at least five days, extending both her and Jerry's stay even longer much to their disappointment. Evelyn appears and tells Morty and Helen that it would take six votes to get them thrown out. She also says her nephew Larry is a good lawyer and offers to have him represent Morty should Jack press charges against Morty.

Production
"The Pen" is the only episode not to feature the character of George Costanza. Jason Alexander threatened to quit the show after the table read featured only two of the main cast actors, Jerry and Elaine. Alexander would later admit that this was caused by insecurity on his part as he was worried that Louis-Dreyfus's role would cause George's role to be diminished over time.

Elaine's repeated screaming of the word "Stella!" after taking too many muscle relaxants is a parody of the 1951 film A Streetcar Named Desire, when Stanley Kowalski, played by Marlon Brando, screams "Stella!" repeatedly in the movie.

References

External links 
 

Seinfeld (season 3) episodes
1991 American television episodes
Television episodes written by Larry David